Animal Chin was a ska punk group from Minneapolis, Minnesota. The group was named after the 1987 skateboarding film, The Search for Animal Chin. They released their debut LP, All the Kids Agree, in 1997, and soon after signed to Fueled By Ramen, who pressed their EP The Ins & Outs of Terrorism! that same year. In 1999, Fueled By Ramen released the LP 20 Minutes from Right Now, but the group split up just before the album's release. Bassist Gruhn went back to finish college, lead singer Woolford went on to form The Stereo and drummer Wuollet joined the group Kill Sadie.

Discography
All the Kids Agree (Kingpin Records, 1997)
The Ins & Outs of Terrorism! EP (Fueled by Ramen, 1997)
Food Not Bombs 7 EP (Fueled by Ramen, 1997)
20 Minutes from Right Now (Fueled by Ramen, 1999)

References

Musical groups from Minnesota
Musical groups from the Twin Cities
American pop punk groups
Musical groups established in 1996
Musical groups disestablished in 2000